Manuel "Manu" Herrera Yagüe (born 29 September 1981) is a Spanish professional footballer who plays as a goalkeeper for CF Intercity.

Club career
Born in Madrid, Herrera joined Real Madrid's youth setup in 1995, aged 13, and made his senior debut with the C team in 2000–01, in Tercera División. He was promoted to the reserves in the Segunda División B the following year, but failed to make an appearance during the season.

After a brief period with amateurs UD Casetas, Herrera joined Palamós CF in the third division. In June 2004 he moved to Atlético Levante UD in the same league, and served as third choice for the main squad in 2006–07 behind José Francisco Molina and Pablo Cavallero.

On 8 August 2007, Herrera was loaned to Segunda División club SD Eibar. His first game as a professional occurred on 10 October, in a 2–1 away loss against Elche CF in the third round of the Copa del Rey. His maiden appearance in the league came late in the same month, a 2–2 home draw with UD Salamanca.

In summer 2008, Herrera returned to the Valencian side, now in division two. Initially a backup to Manolo Reina, he enjoyed a run in the starting XI from November 2009 until March of the following year, and also achieved promotion.

Herrera joined AD Alcorcón also of the second tier on 23 July 2010. After two years as a starter (playing all league matches in the second), he moved to Elche in June 2012.

Herrera won the Ricardo Zamora Trophy in his debut season with the Franjiverdes, who won the league and returned to La Liga after 24 years. On 19 August 2013, one month shy of his 32nd birthday, he made his debut in the competition, starting in the 3–0 away defeat to Rayo Vallecano.

On 13 July 2015, Herrera signed a two-year deal with Real Zaragoza after his contract with Elche expired. On 1 August of the following year he cut ties with the former team, and joined Real Betis the following day.

On 3 August 2017, Herrera agreed to a one-year contract at CA Osasuna. In January 2019, after six competitive appearances at the El Sadar Stadium, the free agent returned to the lower leagues with CD Atlético Baleares.

Honours
Elche
Segunda División: 2012–13

Individual
Ricardo Zamora Trophy: 2012–13

References

External links

1981 births
Living people
Spanish footballers
Footballers from Madrid
Association football goalkeepers
La Liga players
Segunda División players
Segunda División B players
Tercera División players
Primera Federación players
Segunda Federación players
Real Madrid C footballers
Real Madrid Castilla footballers
Palamós CF footballers
Atlético Levante UD players
Levante UD footballers
SD Eibar footballers
AD Alcorcón footballers
Elche CF players
Real Zaragoza players
Real Betis players
CA Osasuna players
CD Atlético Baleares footballers
CF Intercity players